Julián Marchena Valleriestra San José, March 14, 1897 – San José, May 5, 1985) was a Costa Rican poet.  He was a recipient of the Magón National Prize for Culture in 1963.

1897 births
1985 deaths
Writers from San José, Costa Rica
20th-century Costa Rican poets
Costa Rican male poets
20th-century male writers